Kenneth Washington (born October 19, 1946) is a television and film actor who is best remembered for playing Sergeant Richard Baker on the final season of Hogan's Heroes and Officer Miller on Adam-12. Since the death of Robert Clary in November 2022, Washington is the last surviving principal cast member of Hogan's Heroes.

Life and career
Washington was born on October 19, 1946.

In film, Washington was uncredited in 1956's The Birds and the Bees.
Washington started his TV career in 1968 in the  American family drama series, Daktari, that aired on CBS. "Daktari" is Swahili for "doctor." He had a recurring role in Adam-12 as Officer Miller. Washington is remembered by Star Trek fans in the episode "That Which Survives" as the ill-fated Engineer John B. Watkins. In 1970, Washington was cast as a series regular on Hogan's Heroes. He had several guest starring roles throughout the 1970s. In 1989, Washington guest starred on A Different World.

Washington has two children, Kim Lee and Quianna Washington.

Filmography

Film

Television

References

External links
 
 

1946 births
Living people
African-American male actors
American male television actors
20th-century American male actors
20th-century African-American people
21st-century African-American people